Sir Frederick Alexander Robertson KBE (28 February 1854 – 20 December 1918) was a judge and academic administrator. He was educated at King's College London. He joined service and arrived in Punjab, India as Settlement Officer and Assistant Commissioner in 1876 and on special duty in connection with Settlement operations in Maler Kotla, 1888. He became the Director, Land Records and Agriculture in 1889; Divisional Judge in 1896; Temporary Additional Judge, Chief Court, Punjab in 1902 but confirmed in 1904. He served as a puisne judge in Punjab, India and as vice-chancellor of the Punjab University from 1909 to 1910. He was also a lecturer on Mahomedan Law at the Imperial Institute. His publications are Customary Law of Rawalpindi district; also reports on the revised Settlement; and Forest Settlement of that District .

He died in London on 20 December 1918.

References

1854 births
1918 deaths
Alumni of King's College London
Fellows of King's College London
Knights Commander of the Order of the British Empire
Vice-Chancellors of the University of the Punjab